Acacia sericocarpa is a shrub of the genus Acacia and the subgenus Phyllodineae that is endemic to south western Australia.

Description
It can have a rounded habit and a rather dense crown with hairy branchlets. Like most species of Acacia it has phyllodes rather than true leaves. It blooms from August to September and produces yellow flowers. The simple inflorescences are found occurring in pairs in the axils and have spherical flower-heads with a diameter of  conraining 15 to 24 mid-golden coloured flowers.

Taxonomy
The species was first formally described by the botanist William Vincent Fitzgerald in 1904 as a part of the work Additions to the West Australian Flora as published in the Journal of the West Australian Natural History Society. It was reclassified as Racosperma sericocarpum in 2003 by Leslie Pedley than transferred back to genus Acacia in 2006.

Distribution
It is native to an area in the Wheatbelt and Goldfields-Esperance regions of Western Australia where it is commonly situated on flats growing in loamy or sandy-clay soils. The distribution of the shrub extends from Wyalkathem in the north down to around Corrigin and Beverly in the south to around Queen Victoria Rock in the east usually as a part of open Eucalyptus woodland or mallee woodland communities or shrublands of Melaleuca uncinata and species of Casuarina.

See also
 List of Acacia species

References

sericocarpa
Acacias of Western Australia
Taxa named by William Vincent Fitzgerald
Plants described in 1904